Shudi may refer to:
 Burkat Shudi, harpsichord maker
 Shudi, Iran, a village